Wisteria is a genus of flowering plants.

Wisteria  may also refer to:

 Wisteria (color), a light medium violet color equivalent to light lavender
 Wisteria (catalog), American retail catalog and store
 Wisteria (Steve Kuhn album), 2012
 Wisteria (Jimmy Raney album), 1985
 MS Wisteria, a ferry
 Water wisteria, Hygrophila difformis, an aquatic plant
 Summer wisteria, Indigofera decora, a shrub in the indigo family
 Wisteria "Wisty" Allgood, a character in the book Witch and Wizard

See also
 Wistaria (disambiguation)
 Wisteria Lane, the setting of the TV series Desperate Housewives